The 2011 Kashima Antlers season was Kashima Antlers's 19th season in J.League Division 1 and 23rd season overall in the top flight (counting the Japan Soccer League and participation in the inaugural J.League Cup). It also included the 2011 J.League Cup, 2011 Emperor's Cup, and the 2011 AFC Champions League. They finished the season 6th in the championship and lost the chance to break the record of 7 championships they share with Tokyo Verdy.

Players

Current squad
As of 15 December 2010

Out on loan

2011 season transfers
In

Out

Competitions

Super Cup

J.League

League table

Matches

Results by round

J.League Cup

Emperor's Cup

AFC Champions League

Group stage

Standings

Matches

Note 1: The Kashima Antlers v Sydney FC match was postponed from 16 March 2011 to 10 May 2011 due to the 2011 Tōhoku earthquake and tsunami in Japan. The return match, Sydney FC v Kashima Antlers, was brought forward from 10 May 2011 to 13 April 2011. All home matches of the Kashima Antlers were moved to the National Olympic Stadium in Tokyo as the Kashima Soccer Stadium in Kashima was damaged in the earthquake.

Knock-out stage

References

Kashima Antlers
Kashima Antlers seasons